This article lists the winners and nominees for the Black Reel Award for Best Actress in a Motion Picture. Quvenzhané Wallis is currently the youngest winner in this category. Academy Award-nominated or winning performances also honored with nominations or wins at the Black Reel Awards include Quvenzhané Wallis (Beasts of the Southern Wild), Viola Davis (The Help), Gabourey Sidibe (Precious), Sophie Okonedo (Hotel Rwanda) and Halle Berry (Monster's Ball).

Winners and nominees
Winners are listed first and highlighted in bold.

† indicates an Academy Award–winning performance.
‡ indicates an Academy Award–nominated performance that same year.

2000s

2010s

Multiple nominations and wins

Multiple wins
 2 Wins
 Viola Davis
 Sanaa Lathan

Multiple nominations

 5 Nominations
 Viola Davis
 Sanaa Lathan

 4 Nominations
 Halle Berry
 Rosario Dawson
 Queen Latifah

 3 Nominations
 Angela Bassett
 Kimberly Elise
 Nia Long
 Thandiwe Newton
 Zoe Saldana

 2 Nominations
 Beyoncé
 Taraji P. Henson
 Regina King
 Gugu Mbatha-Raw
 Sophie Okonedo
 Keke Palmer
 Gabrielle Union
 Quvenzhané Wallis
 Kerry Washington
 Alfre Woodard

References

Black Reel Awards
Film awards for lead actress